Events from 1989 in England

Incumbent

Events

January
 8 January – The Kegworth air disaster: A British Midland Boeing 737 crashes onto the M1 motorway on the approach to East Midlands Airport, killing 44 people.
 11 January
 Accident investigators say that the Kegworth air disaster was caused when pilot Kevin Hunt, who survived the crash, accidentally shut down the wrong engine.
 Abbey National building society offers free shares to its 5,500,000 members.
 14 January – Muslims demonstrate in Bradford against The Satanic Verses, a book written by Salman Rushdie, burning copies of the book in the city streets.
 25 January – John Cleese wins a libel case after the Daily Mirror described him as having become like his character Basil Fawlty in the sitcom Fawlty Towers.

February
 20 February – IRA bomb the Tern Hill Barracks in Shropshire, injuring 50 soldiers of the Parachute Regiment.
 23 February – 27-year-old William Hague wins the Richmond by-election in North Yorkshire for the Conservative Party following the departure of Leon Brittan to the European Commission.

March
 4 March – Purley rail crash: two trains collide at Purley, Surrey killing six people.
 17 March – The three men convicted of murdering paperboy Carl Bridgewater in Staffordshire 10 years ago have their appeals rejected. A fourth man convicted in connection with the killing died in prison in 1981.

April
 10 April – Nick Faldo becomes the first English winner of Masters Tournament.
 14 April – Ford unveils the latest version of its small Fiesta hatchback, which is being built at the Dagenham plant in England and the Valencia plant in Spain.
 15 April – 94 fans are killed in a crush during the FA Cup semi-final at the Hillsborough Stadium in Sheffield during the FA Cup semi-final between Nottingham Forest FC and Liverpool F.C. Around 300 others have been hospitalized. Several of those injured are in a serious condition and there are fears that the death toll (already the worst of any sporting disaster in Britain) could rise even higher. The youngest victim is a 10-year-old boy, the oldest is 67-year-old Gerard Baron, brother of the late former Liverpool player Kevin Baron.
 16 April – Denis Howell, a former Labour sports minister, urges for the FA Cup final to go ahead this season despite consideration by The Football Association for it to be cancelled due to the Hillsborough disaster.
 17 April – Home Secretary Douglas Hurd announces plans to make all-seater stadiums compulsory for all Football League First Division clubs to reduce the risk of a repeat of the Hillsborough tragedy.
 18 April – 
 Tottenham Hotspur remove perimeter fencing from their White Hart Lane stadium as the first step towards avoiding a repeat of the Hillsborough disaster is taken in English football.
 The Hillsborough disaster claims its 95th victim when 14-year-old Lee Nicol dies in hospital as a result of his injuries. He was visited in hospital by Diana, Princess of Wales, hours before he died.
 19 April – The Sun newspaper sparks outrage on Merseyside with an article entitled "The Truth", which wrongly claims that spectators robbed injured and dead spectators, and attacked police officers when they were helping the injured and dying. See Hillsborough disaster and The Sun.
 20 April - The London Underground is at virtual standstill for a day as most of the workers go on strike in protest against plans for driver-only operated trains.
 28 April
 John Cannan, of Sutton Coldfield, is sentenced to life imprisonment with a recommendation that he should never be released after being found guilty of murdering one woman and sexually assaulting two others.
 Fourteen Liverpool fans are convicted of manslaughter and receive prison sentences of up to three years in Brussels, Belgium, in connection with the Heysel disaster at the 1985 European Cup Final in which 39 spectators (most of them Italian) died. A further eleven Liverpool fans are cleared.

May
 26 May - Arsenal defeat Liverpool 2–0 at Anfield to win the First Division title in most dramatic conclusion to an English football season. Michael Thomas scores Arsenal's crucial second goal in the last minute of the last game of the season, making Arsenal Champions on goals scored with the teams level on both points and goal difference.

June

July

August

September

October

Births
 9 May – Ellen White, footballer
 Unknown date – Roshonara Choudhry, Islamic terrorist convicted of the attempted murder of MP Stephen Timms

Deaths
 14 April – Elizabeth Mary Aslin (1923–1989), English art historian

See also
1989 in Northern Ireland
1989 in Scotland
1989 in Wales

References

 
England
Years of the 20th century in England
1980s in England